The 2001 Omaha Beef season was the team's second season as a football franchise and second in the Indoor Professional Football League (IPFL). One of five teams competing in the IPFL for the 2001 season. The team played their home games at the Omaha Civic Auditorium in Omaha, Nebraska.

Schedule

Regular season

Standings
1. Omaha Beef, 15-1

2. Tennessee ThunderCats, 12-4

3. Boise Stallions, 6-9

4. St. Louis Renegades, 5-11

5. Trenton Lightning, 0-16

Playoffs

Roster

References

Omaha Beef
Omaha Beef seasons
Indoor Professional Football League
Omaha